Altaic languages is a hypothetical language family that was proposed to include the Turkic, Mongolian, and Tungusic.

Altaic may also refer to:

 Altai Mountains, a mountain range in Central and East Asia where Russia, China, Mongolia, and Kazakhstan come together

See also
Altay (disambiguation)
Ural–Altaic languages

Language and nationality disambiguation pages